Ajakirjade Kirjastus was an Estonian publisher which existed 2000–2018.

The publisher was established in 2000, when Eesti Ajakirjade Kirjastus (subsidiary of Eesti Meedia) and Ajakirjade Grupp (subsidiary of Ekspress Grupp) were merged.

In 2010, the publisher was issued 24 magazines/newspapers.

The publisher was the owner of portals, like NaisteMaailm.ee, Kroonika.ee, Toidutare.ee and Telekas.ee.

Since 2011, the publisher sold magazines also through digital news-stall called Zinio.

References

Publishing companies of Estonia